Johannes Ferdinand Reinwaldt (14 May 1890 – 28 June 1958) was a Danish road racing cyclist who competed in the 1912 Summer Olympics. He was born and died in Copenhagen.

In 1912 he was a member of the Danish cycling team which finished eighth in the team time trial event. In the individual time trial competition he finished 48th.

References

1890 births
1958 deaths
Danish male cyclists
Olympic cyclists of Denmark
Cyclists at the 1912 Summer Olympics
Cyclists from Copenhagen